The Thamirabarani or Tamraparni or Porunai is a perennial river that originates from the Agastyarkoodam peak of Pothigai hills of the Western Ghats, above Papanasam in the Ambasamudram taluk. It flows through Tirunelveli and Thoothukudi districts of the Tamil Nadu state of southern India into the Gulf of Mannar. It was called the Tamraparni River in the pre-classical period, a name it lent to the island of Sri Lanka. The old Tamil name of the river is Porunai. This river flows towards north direction initially. However, it changes to east direction later.

Etymology

From the Tamilakam era, the area of the Tamraparni river, in Tirunelveli, Tamil Nadu, has had changes in its name,  from the original Tan Porunai river to Tamira Porunai, from Tamraparni to Tambraparni and now called "Thamirabarani River". A meaning for the term following its derivation became "copper-colored leaf", from the words Thamiram (copper/red) in Tamil/Sanskrit and parani meaning leaf/tree, translating to "river of red leaves". According to the Tamraparni Mahatmyam, an ancient account of the river from its rise to its mouth, a string of red lotus flowers from sage Agastya at Pothigai hills transformed itself into a damsel at the sight of Lord Siva, forming the river and giving it its divine name. Other name derivations include the Pali term "Tambapanni", "Tamradvipa" of Sanskrit speakers and "Taprobana" of ancient Greek cartographers. Robert Knox reported from his 20 years of captivity on the island in the hills that "Tombrane is a name of the Sri Lankan Tamil people for God in Tamil, which they often repeated as they lifted up their hands and faces towards Heaven".

History

Its many name derivations of Tan Porunai include Tampraparani, Tamirabarni, Tamiravaruni. Tan Porunai nathi finds mention by classical Tamil poets in ancient Sangam Tamil literature Purananuru. Recognised as a holy river in Sanskrit literature Puranas, Mahabharata and Ramayana, the river was famed in the Early Pandyan Kingdom for its pearl and conch fisheries and trade. The movement of people, including the faithful, trade merchants and toddy tapers from Tamraparni river to northwestern Sri Lanka led to the shared appellation of the name for the closely connected region. One important historical document on the river is the treatise Tamraparni Mahatmyam. It has many ancient temples along its banks. A hamlet known as Appankoil is located on the northern side of the river.

In the Mahābhārata (3:88) the river is mentioned as "Listen, O son of Kunti, I shall now describe Tamraparni. In that asylum the gods had undergone penances impelled by the desire of obtaining salvation".

A Miami-based Beta Analytic Testing Laboratory published a report on 2021 which claimed that the Tamirabharani civilization along the banks of the river dates back to 3,200 years.

Hydrology

Origin
The river is joined by its headwater tributaries Peyar, Ullar, Pambar before it flows into the Karaiyar Dam reservoir, where it meets Karaiyar. Servalar joins the Thamirabarani before it enters into the Papanasam lower reservoir, which was built for the Papanasam Hydroelectric station. The river descends down the mountains near Papanasam, where it forms the Kalyanatheertham falls and Agasthiar falls.

Course and tributaries
The river flows on the plains eastwards from Papanasam. The first tributary to join Thamirabarani in the plains is the Manimuthar River, which originating from Manjolai hills and joins Thamirabarani near Aladiyoor village. The towns Ambasamudram and Kallidaikurichi are located respectively on the left and right banks of Thamiraparani, after which the river meets the tributary Gadananathi River at Tiruppudaimaruthur.

The Gadananathi is fed by the Jambunathi and Ramanathi Rivers. The river bisects the twin cities Tirunelveli and Palayamkottai before meeting its major and affluent tributary Chithar (Chitranathi) which arises in the Kutralam hills and receives supply from the rivers Gundar, Hanumanathi and Karuppanathi(vairavangkulam kadayanallur) .The Chittar River runs almost parallel to Thamirabarani till it joins the main river near Sivalaperi. Thamirabarani passes through the taluks of Tirunelveli and Palayamkottai of Tirunelveli district and Srivaikundam and Tiruchendur taluks of Thoothukkudi district.

List of major tributaries

Drain

The river drains into Gulf of Mannar near Punnaikayal in Tiruchendur taluk of Tuticorin district. As most of its extensive catchment areas lie in the Western Ghats, the river enjoys the full benefit of both the monsoons, which make the river perennial. Since all its tributaries are arising from the Western ghats, the river is prone to heavy floods especially during the northeast monsoon. In 1992, there was an unexpected flood in Thamirabarani, which claimed hundreds of lives as the dam water was let out so massively and suddenly that the river and its channels could not bear the excess water inflow. It flooded again in 2015 with water entering the Kurukuthurai Murugan Temple.

Irrigation
The many anicuts, dams and reservoirs on the Thamirabarani river, along with those on the Manimuthar River, provide a large proportion of the water for irrigation and power generation for Tirunelveli district. It is fed by both the monsoons – the south west and the north-eastern and is seen in full spate twice a year if the monsoons do not fail. Pachaiyar River has 12 anicuts and irrigates  of wet and dry lands.

The important irrigation channels branching off from both the banks of the river Thamirabarani are, South Kodaimelalagian channel, North Kodaimelalagian channel (Kodaimelalagian anicut), Nathiyunni channel (Nathiyunni anicut), Kannadian channel (Kannadian anicut), Kodagan channel (Ariyanayagipuram anicut), Palayam (Palavur anicut) channel, Tirunelveli channel (Suthamalli anicut), Marudur Melakkal, Marudur Keelakkal (Marudur anicut), South Main Channel and North Main Channel (Srivaikundam anicut). Of these the first seven anicuts were constructed during the period of ancient and medieval rulers and the last anicut namely the Srivaikundam anaicut was constructed and completed by the British in 1869.

List of dams across Thamirabarani river:

 Kodaimelaalagain anicut, 
 Nathiyunni anicut, 
 Kannadian anicut, 
 Ariyanayagipuram anicut, 
 Palavur anicut, 
 Suthamalli anicut, 
 Marudur anicut, 

List of channels:

 South Kodaimelalagain channel
 North Kodaimelalagain channel
 Nathiyunni channel
 Kannadian channel
 Kodagan channel
 Palayam channel
 Tirunelveli channel
 Marudur Melakkal

Pollution and exploitation

Mixing of sewage, paper mill and industrial effluents, dumping etc. into the river is a worrying aspect.
Sand mining in this river was banned in 2010 but it still continues illegally.
Illegal encroachments of its banks is also a growing concern.
Pepsi and other Cola companies bottling facility plants were thought to be exploiting the river water, however a court ruling in April 2018 dismissed the allegations and allowed the companies to extract excess water as per the original agreements they have signed.
Many industries have come in the banks of the river in and around Srivaikuntam that injudicially use the river water and discharge untreated sewer.
Untreated sewer of towns like Ambasamudram, Tirunelveli, Papanasam etc. also reduce the water quality downstream.
 Religious practices like letting your clothes along the river at Papanasam as an act to wash sins after a bath has also clogged up the river..
After the Sorimuthu Aiyanar Temple yearly festival upstream in the forests near Karayar dam the bacteria level in the river increases as thousands and thousands of people bathe at one go.

Fishes 

Thamirabarani River is full of fishes and it is one of the perennial rivers in Tamil Nadu. Locals not involved in fishing resulting in the vast diversity of fishes in the river.

As water flows non-stop throughout the year, it is one of the most fish-rich river in the world where the river is dominated by more than 16 native Snakehead species. It is estimated that nearly 669 fish species found in the river.

Snakehead 
Various types of snakehead fish species like Channa diplogramma, Channa bleheri, Channa striata, Channa maculata, Channa punctata, Channa harcourtbutleri, Channa asiatica, Channa marulius found throughout the river. Snakeheads are considered as top level predators in Thamirabarani River. Northern Snakehead also found in small numbers on the starting part of river where top level predators like other snakeheads are missing. Thamirabarani River is the largest reservoir of Snakehead in the world with 17 types of Snakeheads present in this river. Snakehead fishes are locally called as Viraal in Tamil and all the species are consumed as food around the regions of Thamirabarani when they enter paddy fields.

Catfish 
Following Snakehead, Catfish are also abundant in the river. African Catfish are an invasive species first caught in 2009 in the Aruvankulam area of Tirunelveli district.  The most common catfish species found are Blue Catfish, Channel Catfish, Flathead Catfish, Mystus guli Catfish, Pangas Catfish, P. hodgarti, Goonch catfish, Pseudolaguvia. 13 species of Catfish species found throughout this river.

Alligator Gar 
Alligator Gar is not native to the river but caught sometimes. this was the result of releasing aquarium fish into the wild. on 2015, over 100 Juvenile alligator gar fishes caught and handed over to local authority. Because of the presence of huge number of native Snakehead fishes, the Alligator Gar invasion is not spreading and under control.

Eels 
Eels found in this river mainly belongs to Anguillidae and Synbranchiformes family and most common one is Indian mottled eel (Anguilla b. bengalensis). 90 species of eel found in this river. the fish Macrognathus found in this river is mistakenly thought as eel because of its eel-like structure.

Carp 
Carp fishes found in large numbers throughout the river. Three type of carp fishes are silver carp, grass carp, common carp. These three species of carp form 75% of carp fish population in Thamirabarani River.

Loaches 
Large number of species of sucker fishes found throughout the river. the most common one is Acanthocobitis botia and Horseface loach.

Pangio loach, Schistura loach also common in this river and Schistura is mistakenly treated as snake or eel because of its snake-like appearance.

Others 
Other fishes belong to genus Puntius, Devario, Etroplus, Mystus, Aplocheilus, Dawkinsia, Garra, Glossogobius, Macrognathus, Batasio, Barilius, Badidae, Clupisoma, Nemacheilus, Oreichthys, Oryzias, Osteobrama, Raiamas, Salmophasia, Tor (Masheer), Xenentodon,  are commonly found in this river.

References

External links

Rivers of Tamil Nadu
Geography of Tirunelveli district
Thoothukudi district
Tirunelveli
Rivers in Buddhism
Rivers of India